Hebeloma stenocystis is a species of mushroom in the family Hymenogastraceae.

stenocystis